Tsesarevich was the title of the heir apparent or presumptive in the Russian Empire. It either preceded or replaced the given name and patronymic.

Usage
It is often confused with "tsarevich", which is a distinct word with a different meaning: Tsarevich was the title for any son of a tsar, including sons of non-Russian rulers accorded that title, e.g. Crimea, Siberia, Georgia. Normally, there was only one tsesarevich at a time (an exception was Grand Duke Constantine Pavlovich, who was accorded the title until death, even though law gave it to his nephew), and the title was used exclusively in Russia.

The title came to be used invariably in tandem with the formal style "Successor", as in "His Imperial Highness the Successor Tsesarevich and Grand Prince". The wife of the Tsesarevich was the Tsesarevna.

History
In 1721 Peter the Great discontinued use of "tsar" as his main title, and adopted that of imperator (emperor), whereupon the title of tsarevich (and "tsarevna", retained for life by Ivan V's daughters) fell into desuetude. The Emperor's daughters were henceforth referred to as "tsesarevna" (Peter had no living son by this time). In 1762, upon succeeding to the imperial throne, Peter III accorded his only son Paul Petrovich (by the future Catherine the Great) the novel title of tsesarevich, he being the first of nine Romanov heirs who would bear it. However, at the time the title was conferred, Paul was recognised as Peter's legal son, but not as his legal heir. Nor would he be officially recognised as such by his mother after her usurpation of the throne.

More often he was internationally referred to by his other title of "Grand Duke" (actual meaning in Russian language is "Grand Prince"), which pre-dated tsesarevich, being a holdover from the Rurikid days before the grand dukes of Muscovy adopted the title of tsar. When Paul acceded to the throne in 1796, he immediately declared his son Aleksandr Pavlovich tsesarevich, and the title was confirmed by law in 1797 as the official title for the heir to the throne (incorporated into Article 145 of the Fundamental Laws). In 1799 Paul I granted the title tsesarevich to his second son Constantine Pavlovich, who, oddly, retained the title even after he renounced the throne in 1825 in favor of their younger brother, Nicholas I.

Thenceforth, each Emperor's eldest son bore the title until 1894, when Nicholas II conferred it on his brother Grand Duke George Aleksandrovich, with the stipulation that his entitlement to it would terminate upon the birth of a son to Nicholas, who was then betrothed to Alix of Hesse. When George died in 1899, Nicholas did not confer the title upon his oldest surviving brother Michael Aleksandrovich, although Nicholas's only son would not be born for another five years. That son, Alexei Nikolaevich (1904–1918), became the Russian Empire's last tsesarevich.

Tsesarevich of Russia

Tsesarevna of Russia
The wife of an heir-tsesarevich bore the title Tsesarevna – Grand Duchess. In first years of Russian Empire the female heirs of Peter I of Russia bore this title: his daughters Elizabeth of Russia (born 1709), Anna Petrovna (1708–1728) and Natalia Petrovna (1718–1725). This word is not to be confused with Tsarevna, used before 18th century for all the Tsar's daughters and daughters-in-law.

Many princesses from Western Europe, who converted to Orthodox Christianity and changed their given names accordingly, were given the patronymic Fyodorovna not because their fathers were named "Theodore", but as an allegory based on the name of Theotokos of St. Theodore, the patron icon of the Romanov family.

Post-monarchy
After claiming the Russian throne in exile in 1924 Grand Duke Cyril Vladimirovich of Russia designated his son, Grand Duke Vladimir Cyrillovich of Russia, Tsesarevich. Since 1997 the title has been attributed to Vladimir's grandson, George Mikhailovich Romanov, whose mother, Maria Vladimirovna, conferred it on him in her capacity as pretender to the throne. Those who refer to him by a dynastic title, however, more usually address him as "grand duke".

Until the end of the empire most people in Russia and abroad, verbally and in writing continued to refer to the Sovereign as "tsar". Perhaps for that reason the title of tsesarevich was less frequently used to refer to the heir apparent than either "tsarevich" or "grand duke".

See also
 List of heirs to the Russian throne

References

1762 establishments in the Russian Empire
Noble titles created in 1762
Noble titles of Russia
Heirs to the throne